KLOV may refer to:

Geography
Klov, an historical neighbourhood in the Ukrainian capital Kyiv

Art, entertainment, and media
Killer List of Videogames, a website devoted to cataloging videogames
KLOV (FM), a radio station (89.3 FM) licensed to Winchester, Oregon, United States
K-LOVE, a Christian Radio network in the United States